Cyrtodactylus nigriocularis is a species of geckos endemic to Southern Vietnam.

Description
This species can be distinguished by its depressed head with a wide and depressed snout; its moderately slender body, which is elongate, with developed ventrolateral folds; moderately long limbs and digits long; a tail that is longer than the snount-vent length, which carries large undivided subcaudals; 13–14 upper labials, 13–15 lower labials, 17–21 narrow subdigital lamellaes on its fourth toe; about 119–145 scale rows around its midbody; and no femoral large scales present.

References

Cyrtodactylus
Endemic fauna of Vietnam
Reptiles of Vietnam
Reptiles described in 2006